Prof. PaedDr. Štefan Šutaj, DrSc. (born November 1, 1954) is a Slovak historian and professor at Pavol Jozef Šafárik University, specializing in the history of Hungarian minority in Czechoslovakia and Slovak civic (non-communist) political parties after 1945. He is research worker and head of Department of History of the Institute of Social Sciences of the Slovak Academy of Sciences and also Slovak chairman of the Slovak-Hungarian Commission of Historians.

In 2008 he founded and until 2012 was departmental chair of the Department of History of the Faculty of Arts of the Pavol Jozef Šafárik University. Now he is deputy departmental chair and teaches there French historiography, Slovak history after 1945 and Proseminar in History.

Works
 
 
 
 
 
 
 
 
 
 
 
 
 
 
 
 
 
 Šutaj, Štefan. The Magyar minority in Slovakia before and after the Second World War. In Teich, Mikuláš; Kováč, Dušan; Brown, Martin (eds.) (2011). Slovakia in history. Cambridge; New York: Cambridge University Press. .

Footnotes

External links
 Pavol Jozef Šafárik University Bio
 Slovak Academy of Sciences Bio
 Publications Works by Štefan Šutaj in libraries (WorldCat catalog)

1955 births
20th-century Slovak historians
21st-century Slovak historians
Living people